Forrest W. Perkins (November 13, 1920 – December 13, 2014) was an American football, baseball, and track and field coach and college athletics administrator. He served as the head football coach at the University of Wisconsin–Whitewater from 1956 to 1984, compiling a record of 185–93–8. He was the school's athletic director from 1971 until his retirement in 1984. He also coached baseball and track and field at Wisconsin–Whitewater.

Perkins was born on November 13, 1920, and attended Dodgeville High School in Dodgeville, Wisconsin.  He earned a bachelor's degree in education from University of Wisconsin–Platteville, where he played football, basketball, and baseball.  Perkins served in World War II with the United States Marine Corps while enrolled at Wisconsin–Platteville.  He obtained a master's degree from the University of Wisconsin–Madison in 1950 and coached football and baseball at the high school level in the state of Wisconsin before arriving at Wisconsin–Whitewater.

Head coaching record

Football

References

External links
 

1920 births
2014 deaths
American men's basketball players
Wisconsin–Platteville Pioneers baseball players
Wisconsin–Platteville Pioneers football players
Wisconsin–Platteville Pioneers men's basketball players
Wisconsin–Whitewater Warhawks athletic directors
Wisconsin–Whitewater Warhawks baseball coaches
Wisconsin–Whitewater Warhawks football coaches
College track and field coaches in the United States
High school baseball coaches in the United States
High school football coaches in Wisconsin
United States Marine Corps personnel of World War II
Military personnel from Wisconsin
United States Marines
University of Wisconsin–Madison alumni
People from Iowa County, Wisconsin
Players of American football from Wisconsin